Shenzhen Metro Line 11 opened on 28 June 2016. It connects the CBDs of Futian, Nanshan and Qianhai to Shenzhen Bao'an International Airport and onward to Fuyong, Shajing and Songgang suburban areas. It serves as both a regional express line from the west coast of Shenzhen to the city core area and an airport rail link. Compared with the other lines of Shenzhen Metro, Line 11 has a longer spacing between stops for a higher speed service. Construction of Line 11 started in April 2012 and test running begun at the end of March 2016. Trains run at a 4-minute frequency between Futian and Airport North, 8-minute frequency for full length trains during morning rush hours, 5-minute interval for full length during evening rush hours, and 6-minute interval for non-peak hours. Currently it takes slightly more than half an hour to travel from Futian to the Airport.

History
In 2007, the "Shenzhen City Rail Transit Construction Plan (2011 to 2020)" was publicly announced for the first time, which included the plans for Line 11. The plan calls for an express metro line running along the western coast of Shenzhen with through services to Dongguan, Guangzhou and beyond via the Guangzhou–Shenzhen intercity railway which was then envisioned to be an intercity metro line. In December 2008, a ground breaking ceremony was held for the project, attended by Party Secretary Wang Yang and Governor Huang Huahua. However, design changes started immediately after due to disagreements on how to integrate the metro project with the intercity line. Subsequently, the project was postponed.

In July 2010, China Railway Minister Liu Zhijun and Guangdong Executive Vice Governor Zhu Xiaodan held talks to speed up railway construction in Guangdong. The result was a new plan to construct a Pearl River Delta Metropolitan Region intercity railway network. The Guangzhou–Shenzhen intercity railway was redesigned from a rapid transit line to a regional rail line and will no longer enter the central area of Shenzhen. Instead the Guangzhou–Shenzhen intercity railway shall terminate at  station with interchange for Line 11 but no through services.

Timeline

Service routes
  — 
  —  / 
  —  (MondayFriday AM peak hours only)

Stations

Future Development 
Line 11 is planned to have an east extension to Hongling South. The one-station extension from Futian to Gangxia North opened on 28 October 2022 and the remaining 3 stations are currently under construction.

Additional proposals include a northern extension into Chang'an, Dongguan with transfers to Dongguan Rail Transit.

Rolling stock
On 4 July 2015, the first train completed eight months of commissioning work, and 10 trains have been delivered from CRRC Zhuzhou as of March 2016. The maximum train capacity is 2564 people.

Business Class
Business Class has transverse seating and curtains for comfort and luggage racks for airport passengers. To ride Business Class passengers have to pay a premium for their ticket, similar to First Class on the MTR East Rail line. Business Class carriages are marked by dark grey floor tiles and yellow panels above the platform screen doors. Standard class carriages are marked by light grey floor tiles and white panels above the doors.

Fares
Two kinds of fares are charged on Line 11. In standard class, the fare is equivalent to other metro lines. Business Class is three times as expensive as standard class. Standard class fares range between 2 and 10 yuan, with Business Class ranging between 6 and 30 yuan. Because of the possibility of transfers, this makes the maximum possible fare on the Shenzhen Metro 35 yuan. Business Class can be accessed through placing the Shenzhen Tong on a validator or through purchasing a yellow token (standard tokens are green). 11% of passengers travel by Business Class.

References

Shenzhen Metro lines
Railway lines opened in 2016
Airport rail links in China